Slania/Evocation I – The Arcane Metal Hammer Edition is the first compilation album by Swiss folk metal band Eluveitie.

History 
It was released in Germany on 15 April 2009 through Nuclear Blast as bonus of the May Edition from the Metal Hammer magazine. The release is an exclusive release for Metal Hammer magazine and is not easy to find in record stores, but it is possible.

Track listing
 "The Arcane Dominion" - 5:41
 "Gray Sublime Archon" - 4:22
 "Brictom" - 4:22
 "Inis Mona (including live intro)" - 4:42
 "Memento" - 3:20
 "Bloodstained Ground" - 3:20
 "Within the Grove" - 1:52
 "The Cauldron of Renascence" - 2:02
 "The Somber Lay" - 3:59
 "Omnos" - 3:48
 "Slania's Song" - 5:41
 "Voveso in Mori" - 4:07
 "Slania (Folk Medley)" - 1:52

Credits 
 Anna Murphy – hurdy-gurdy
 Chrigel Glanzmann – tin and low whistles, uilleann pipes, acoustic guitar, bodhràn, vocals
 Ivo Henzi – guitar
 Simeon Koch – guitar, vocals
 Meri Tadic – violin, vocals
 Kay Brem – bass
 Merlin Sutter – drums
 Päde Kistler - tin and low whistles, gaita and other bagpipes 
 Rafi Kirder – bass
 Sevan Kirder – tin and low whistles, gaita
All music arranged by Eluveitie

References

2009 albums
Eluveitie compilation albums
Nuclear Blast albums